{{DISPLAYTITLE:C9H10O}}
The molecular formula C9H10O (molar mass: 134.17 g/mol) may refer to:

 Allyl phenyl ether
 Anol
 Chavicol
 Chromane
 Cinnamyl alcohol
 4-Ethylbenzaldehyde
 Hydrocinnamaldehyde
 Phenylacetone
 Propiophenone
 4-Vinylanisole